The 2022 The Basketball Classic (TBC) was a single-elimination men's college basketball postseason tournament featuring National Collegiate Athletic Association (NCAA) Division I teams not selected to participate in the NCAA tournament or the National Invitation Tournament (NIT).  The tournament began on March 15 with the semifinals played on March 29 and the championship game played on April 1. The tournament was won by the Fresno State Bulldogs.

The Basketball Classic was founded by Eracism. This was the tournament's inaugural edition, officially known as the 2022 The Basketball Classic presented by Eracism. All games were streamed on ESPN+.

Structure
Tournament organizers originally announced that there would be 32 teams in the field. However, when the participating teams were named, there were only 21 listed. Three teams then withdrew prior to competing, leaving the actual field size at 18 for the tournament. In lieu of a traditional bracket, a model previously used by the NIT was implemented, in which the matchups are set after each round. Later-round host sites are determined, at least in part, by first-round game attendance figures.

Five matchups in the tournament were designated as "Legend Games", honoring Willis Reed, Travis Grant, Zelmo Beaty, Marques Haynes and Cleo Hill, all of whom played college basketball at historically black colleges and universities (HBCUs). In addition to advancing in the tournament, the winning teams received a trophy honoring the legend for whom the particular game was named. Due to scheduling issues, the Cleo Hill game was not played.  As of March 15, 2023, no updates have been made to the group's website indicating that the event would be held in 2023.

Participating teams

The following 18 teams accepted invitations to the tournament and competed. Team records listed are from before the tournament started.

Three programs accepted invitations, but withdrew prior to playing: Merrimack, UMBC, Wofford.

The following programs declined invitations: Arkansas State, Liberty, Oakland, Samford, Sam Houston State, Utah Valley, Weber State.

Schedule

Bracket
The Basketball Classic field was announced after the field for the NIT was released on March 13.

Note: Bracket is for visual purposes only. In lieu of a traditional bracket, the field and matchups are re-set after each round.

With an 18-team bracket, organizers chose to match one second-round winner against Portland, with three other second-round winners advancing directly to the semifinals.

Home teams listed second.
* – Denotes overtime periods

Awards
The following most valuable players were selected for each of the Legend Games:
 Zelmo Beaty Game – Rudi Williams, Coastal Carolina
 Marques Haynes Game – Dwayne Cohill, Youngstown State
 Travis Grant Game – Javon Franklin, South Alabama
 Willis Reed Game – Dre Marin, Southern Utah

Notes

References

External links
 The Basketball Classic official website

The Basketball Classic
Basketball Classic, The
Basketball Classic, The
College basketball tournaments in South Carolina
Conway, South Carolina